The State of Mind Report is the sixth studio album by Polish thrash metal band Acid Drinkers. It was released on 22 April 1996 in Poland through Polton and Warner Music Poland. The album was recorded from 22 January to 9 February 1996 at Deo Recordings Studio in Wisła and was mixed at Buffo Studio in Warsaw. The cover art was created by Litza, Ewa Ludmiła Fedan, Zygmunt Tomala, Paweł Nowicki and fotos by Piotr Stańczak.

Track listing

Bonus tracks

Personnel 
 Tomasz "Titus" Pukacki – vocals, bass, guitar on track 9
 Robert "Litza" Friedrich – backing vocals, guitar, lead vocal on track 4, 8
 Dariusz "Popcorn" Popowicz – guitar
 Maciej "Ślimak" Starosta – drums, backing vocals
Music and lyrics – Acid Drinkers (expect "Wild Thing": Chip Taylor and "Walkway to Heaven": Litza, Marcin Pospieszalski)

Engineered – Adam Toczko, Tomasz Bonarowski
Mastering – Grzegorz Piwkowski
Lori Wallett – vocal on track 10
Steve Wallett – additional vocal on track 10
Tomasz Budzyński (Armia) – additional vocal on track 8
Darek Malejonek (Houk) – additional vocal on track 8
Dariusz Cichor – additional vocal on track 8
Dziki – additional vocal on track 8
Jacek – additional vocal on track 8
The Stawski Orchestra track 10
Michał Kulenty – flue on track 10
Marcin Pospieszalski – bass and violins on track 10

Release history

References 

1996 albums
Acid Drinkers albums